Amnesty International India was a country unit of the Amnesty International network, and was part of a global movement promoting and defending  human rights and dignity. In September 2020, Amnesty halted its operations in the country after all bank accounts of the organization were frozen. The organization called this as 'witch hunting' while the government of India said the organisation's FCRA had been declined one after other for 20 years by different governments in power as per the law

History
An Amnesty International office was first set up in India in Bihar in 1966. Since then, the organization has worked on cases related torture, prisoners of conscience, abusive laws, women's rights, corporate accountability and other human rights violations.

On 13 August 2016, Amnesty held an event in Bengaluru  to discuss human rights violations in Kashmir, After the event, the Akhil Bharatiya Vidyarthi Parishad filed a first information report (FIR) against Amnesty India for being anti-national. Amnesty India denied that the organization or its staff had been involved in any anti-national activities. Sedition charges were pressed against Amnesty, but were dropped later on.

On 15 November 2019 the Central Bureau of Investigation raided the offices of Amnesty International India in Bengaluru and New Delhi during an investigation into an alleged breach of foreign funding laws. In a statement issued by CBI, they said "It was alleged that the provision of the Foreign Contribution (Regulation) Act 2010 and Indian Penal Code were contravened". Aakar Patel was the chief of Amnesty in 2019.

In 2020, Amnesty claimed that "reprisals" from the Indian government froze the organization's bank account, forcing it to lay off staff, suspend all campaign and research work, and otherwise halt operations in India. The Ministry of Home Affairs claims that Amnesty violated the Foreign Contribution Regulation Act (FCRA) as "a significant amount of foreign money was also remitted to Amnesty (India) without MHA’s approval under FCRA" and "owing to these illegal practices of Amnesty, the previous government had also rejected the repeated applications of Amnesty to receive funds from overseas. This had led Amnesty to suspend its India operations once during that period as well."

On 16 February 2021, the Enforcement Directorate attached properties worth ₹17.66 crore (about $2.4 million, at that time) of the organisation in connection with an alleged violation of the Foreign Contribution Regulation Act (FCRA).

Campaigns

Amnesty International India collaborates with Railway Protection Force, Western Railways in Mumbai to ensure female passengers’ right to safety. It also ran a campaign to reduce the number of under-trials in jails in India. Some of Amnesty India's campaigns include seeking justice for the victims in the 1984 anti-Sikh riots as well as opposing the use of the death penalty in India.

References

External links
 

Amnesty International
Human rights organisations based in India